Jane Boake-Cope is a former German curler.

She is a former European champion.

Teams

References

External links

German female curlers
European curling champions
German curling champions